is a Japanese idol, singer, actor, scriptwriter, radio host and lyricist. Yokoyama is also a member of Kanjani Eight, which is under the management of Johnny & Associates. His image color in the group is black.

Career
Yokoyama entered Johnny's on Christmas 1996 where he met fellow members Subaru Shibutani and Shingo Murakami. The reason he entered Johnny's is because his mother briefly saw his classmate on TV and said, "My kid is better looking." Rare among Johnny's talent, Yokoyama has been given a stage name. This has been said due to the difficult kanji of his real name, . It is believed that "You" has been chosen by Johnny Kitagawa as it is easy to say. Although he has a stage name, nobody actually refers to him as "You", not even Johnny who is famous for referring to other people as "You".

When appearing in variety shows and radio, Yokoyama and Murakami are the two most talkative members. He has even been called a comedian due to his talking style. However, off screen, Yokoyama is very shy. He rarely speaks whilst in the dressing room, as he is too busy playing games.

Recently, Yokoyama has been appearing in quite a few dramas such as The Quiz Show 2 and Hidarime Tantei EYE.

Yokoyama's mother died at age 50 on May 16, 2010 at 11:51 pm. She collapsed while shopping, and was taken to the hospital in an ambulance. Sources say that it might have been a heart attack. The funeral was held on May 18, which all the members of Kanjani8 attended.

Discography

Solo songs
"Confusion"
"Fantastic Music!"
"Wonder Boy"
"413man" (Lyrics by Yokoyama)
"Trickster"

Filmography

Drama

Movie

Stage
Kyo to Kyo (April – November 1998)
Mask (December 1998)
Tōa Hiren (October 2001, June – July 2002)
Aoki-san Ie no Okusan (February 2002)
Takizawa Enbu Jō (March 2006)
Dream Boys ( 2006)
Bluemoon (May 2015)
上を下へのジレッタ (May 2017)

Radio
1994–2002: Furumoto Shinnosuke Chapara Suka Woo! – Chapara Fight Thursdays – Yokoyama You & Murakami Shingo no Warau Daisōsa Sen (JOQR 1134)
2002–2003: Super Star Qr (JOQR 1134)
2003–2013: Kanjani Eight – Yokoyama You & Murakami Shingo no Recomen! (JOQR 1134)

Concerts

You Yokoyama ga Yacchaimasu Concert (Osaka Shochikuza Theater) (December 2007)
You Yokoyama ga Yacchaimasu 2 Concert Spring 2008 (Nagoya and Tokyo) (March 2008)
You Yokoyama ga Yacchaimasu 3 Concert Spring 2010 (14 prefectures) (April 2 – May 30, 2010)

Endorsements
 Tamagochi (1997)
 Video Sugao 2 Selling (1999)
 Video Sugao 3 Selling (2001)
 TV Guide (December 2007, together with Murakami Shingo)

References

External links
Kanjani8 at Johnny & Associates Official Site
Kanjani8 at Imperial Records Official Site

1981 births
Living people
Kanjani Eight members
Japanese male pop singers
Japanese idols
Musicians from Osaka